Ali Ferruh Bey was an Ottoman Empire envoy to the United States. Sinan Kuneralp, author of "Ottoman Diplomatic and Consular Personnel in the United States of America, 1867–1917," described him as the most well-known Ottoman envoy to the U.S.

The Ottoman Ministry of Foreign Affairs prohibited Muslim employees in the diplomatic service from bringing their families, yet Ali Ferruh brought his wife and her family to the U.S. Kuneralp concluded that he was "obviously a man of resources".

In 1900 he was recalled and replaced by Mustafa Shekib Bey.

See also
 Ottoman Empire-United States relations

References

External links
 
 

Ambassadors of the Ottoman Empire to the United States
Year of birth missing
Year of death missing